is a Japanese politician serving in the House of Representatives in the Diet (national legislature) as a member of the Liberal Democratic Party. A native of Kariya, Aichi and graduate of the University of Tokyo he was elected for the first time in 2005. He also passed the examination for Certified Public Accountant in 1983.

References

External links 
  website in Japanese.

1960 births
Living people
Politicians from Aichi Prefecture
University of Tokyo alumni
Japanese accountants
Koizumi Children
Members of the House of Representatives (Japan)
Liberal Democratic Party (Japan) politicians